The National Library of Ecuador (Spanish: Biblioteca Nacional del Ecuador "Eugenio Espejo") is located in Quito, Ecuador. The library is named after the writer and lawyer Eugenio Espejo.

In 1859, an earthquake destroyed the library.

See also 
 List of national and state libraries

References

External links 
 .

Ecuador
Libraries in Ecuador